Minerva's Garden (Giardino della Minerva) is located in the heart of the old town of Salerno, in a zone known as the "Plaium montis" in the Middle Ages. It is halfway along an ideal route that runs along the axis of the walled and terraced vegetable gardens, climbing from the Municipal Park, near the river Fusandola, towards the Arechi Castle.

History

The "viridarium" was owned by the Silvatico family from the 12th century, as recorded by a parchment conserved in the Badia archives in Cava de' Tirreni. Later on, in the first twenty years of the 14th century, Matteo Silvatico created a garden of simples here, a forerunner of all future botanical gardens in Europe.

In this area of extraordinary cultural value, which can now be identified in the area of the Minerva's Garden, he cultivated some of the plants used to produce the active ingredients employed for therapeutic purposes. Matteo Silvatico also taught here, showing the plants to the scholars at the School of Medicine and providing their names and characteristics. During a recent archaeological dig, the mediaeval garden was found at a depth of around two metres under the current ground level.

The last owner was Giovanni Capasso who, thanks to the interest of the lawyer Gaetano Nunziante, chairman of the Asilo di Mendicità, donated the whole property to this charitable institution immediately after the Second World War. In November 1991 a project was presented for the creation of a botanical garden dedicated to Silvatico and his garden of simples. This project was funded and developed in 2000 by the Municipal Council, using funds from the European Urban programme. Now that the restoration work has been completed, visitors to the garden can see an interesting series of elements dating back to the 17th and 18th century. One of the most attractive is the long flight of steps, marked by cruciform pillars, which support a wooden pergola.

Botanical species

Minerva's Garden is not a traditional botanical garden, but follows specific themes in various zones. The most important educational element of the theme linked to Salerno's botanical tradition is the illustration, in the largest terrace in the garden, of the ancient plant classification system. In all the other flower beds in the garden, the plants are arranged on the basis of landscaping. All the species are identified with a label that refers to the ideal position of the simple in a design representing the positioning of the elements, superimposed over the concentric subdivision of the grades.

After the 2001 restoration, several rare species were planted, mostly chosen among those quoted in the Opus Pandectarum Medicinae, which were used as medicines in the Middle Age.

List of the species

A 
 Acanthus mollis
 Achillea millefolium
 Aconitum napellus
 Acorus calamus
 Adiantum capillus-veneris
 Agrimonia eupatoria
 Ajuga reptans
 Alisma plantago-aquatica
 Aloe vera
 Allium schoenoprasum
 Allium ursinum
 Alpinia zerumbet
 Althaea officinalis
 Ammi visnaga
 Anchusa officinalis
 Anethum graveolens
 Anthemis cotula
 Anthriscus cerefolium
 Arbutus unedo
 Arctium lappa
 Aristolochia clematitis
 Armoracia rusticana
 Artemisia abrotanum
 Artemisia absinthium
 Artemisia dracunculus
 Arum italicum
 Asarum europaeum
 Asparagus acutifolius
 Asphodelus albus
 Asplenium ceterach
 Asplenium scolopendrium
 Athyrium filix-femina
 Atropa belladonna

B
 Berberis vulgaris
 Borago officinalis
 Calamintha nepeta

C
 Calendula officinalis
 Campanula medium
 Capparis spinosa
 Carthamus tinctorius
 Carum carvi
 Cassia fistula
 Centranthus ruber
 Ceratonia siliqua
 Chamaemelum nobile
 Chelidonium majus
 Cinnamomum camphora
 Cistus creticus
 Cistus ladanifer
 Cistus monspeliensis
 Citrus limon
 Citrus medica
 Citrus reticulata
 Citrus sinensis
 Colocasia esculenta
 Conium maculatum
 Coriandrum sativum
 Cornus mas
 Crataegus azarolus
 Crithmum maritimum
 Crocus sativus
 Cucumis sativus
 Cupressus sempervirens
 Cyclamen hederifolium
 Cydonia oblonga
 Cyperus papyrus
 Cytinus hypocistis

D
 Dactylorhiza maculata
 Diplotaxis tenuifolia
 Dipsacus fullonum
 Doronicum pardalianches
 Dracaena draco

E
 Elettaria cardamomum
 Euphorbia cyparissias

F
 Ficus carica
 Filipendula ulmaria
 Filipendula vulgaris
 Foeniculum vulgare
 Fragaria vesca
 Fraxinus ornus

G
 Galega officinalis
 Galium verum
 Gladiolus italicus
 Glaucium flavum
 Glycyrrhiza glabra
 Gossypium herbaceum

H
 Hedera helix
 Helichrysum italicum
 Helichrysum stoechas
 Helleborus viridis
 Hippophae rhamnoides
 Hyoscyamus albus
 Hyoscyamus niger
 Hypericum perforatum
 Hyssopus officinalis

I
 Inula helenium
 Iris florentina
 Isatis tinctoria

J
 Jasminum officinale
 Jasminum sambac
 Juniperus communis

K
 Kickxia elatine

L
 Lablab purpureus
 Laurus nobilis
 Lavandula angustifolia
 Lavandula dentata
 Levisticum officinale
 Lilium martagon
 Linum usitatissimum
 Lithospermum officinale
 Lonicera caprifolium
 Lycopus europaeus
 Lysimachia vulgaris
 Lythrum salicaria

M
 Malva sylvestris
 Mandragora autumnalis
 Matricaria recutita
 Melilotus officinalis
 Melissa officinalis
 Mentha aquatica
 Mentha longifolia
 Mentha suaveolens
 Meum athamanticum
 Myriophyllum aquaticum
 Miriofillo
 Myrtus communis
 Myrtus communis

N
 Narcissus tazetta
 Nasturtium microphyllum
 Nepeta cataria
 Nerium oleander
 Nigella damascena
 Nuphar lutea
 Nymphaea alba

O
 Ocimum tenuiflorum 
 Olea europaea
 Ononis spinosa
 Origanum majorana
 Origanum vulgare
 Osmunda regalis

P
 Paeonia officinalis
 Pastinaca sativa
 Petroselinum crispum
 Petroselinum sativum
 Phoenix dactylifera
 Physalis alkekengi
 Pimpinella anisum
 Piper nigrum
 Pistacia lentiscus
 Pistacia vera
 Plantago major
 Polygonatum odoratum
Polypodium vulgare
 Portulaca oleracea
 Potentilla erecta
 Prunus armeniaca
 Prunus avium
 Prunus cerasus
 Prunus domestica
 Psyllium afrum
 Punica granatum
 Pyrus communis

R
 Rhamnus catharticus
 Rheum rhabarbarum
 Ricinus communis
 Rosa gallica
 Rosa canina
 Rosa sempervirens
 Rosmarinus officinalis
 Rubia tinctorum
 Rubus idaeus
 Rubus ulmifolius
 Rumex acetosa
 Ruscus aculeatus
 Ruscus hypoglossum
 Ruta graveolens

S
 Saccharum officinarum
 Salix alba
 Salvia officinalis
 Sambucus nigra
 Santolina chamaecyparissus
 Saponaria officinalis
Satureja hortensis
 Satureja montana
 Scrophularia nodosa
 Sempervivum tectorum
 Sesamum indicum
 Silene coronaria
Silybum marianum
 Sinapis alba
 Smilax aspera
 Sorbus domestica
 Spartium junceum
 Stachys officinalis
 Symphytum officinale

T
 Tanacetum balsamita
 Tanacetum parthenium
 Tanacetum vulgare
 Taraxacum officinale
 Taxus baccata
 Teucrium chamaedrys
 Thalictrum flavum
Thymus vulgaris
 Thymus serpyllum
 Trigonella foenum-graecum

U
 Umbilicus rupestris
 Urginea maritima

V
 Valeriana officinalis
 Verbascum thapsus
 Verbena officinalis
 Viola odorata
 Vitex agnus-castus
 Vitis vinifera

W
 Withania somnifera

Z
 Ziziphus jujuba

External links

 Official website

See also
 Salerno
 List of botanical gardens in Italy

Botanical gardens in Italy